Dysschema subapicalis is a moth of the family Erebidae first described by Francis Walker in 1854. It is restricted to the Atlantic forests of south-eastern Brazil.

Adults are sexually dimorphic.

References

Moths described in 1854
Dysschema